Denis Patrick O'Brien, FBA (born 1939 in Knebworth, Hertfordshire, England) is an English economist who has worked in industrial economics and the history of economic thought. 

O'Brien graduated in 1960 with a BSc (Economics) from University College London. From 1963 to 1972 he was Assistant Lecturer, Lecturer and then Reader in Economics at Queen's University Belfast. From 1972 to 1997 he was Professor of Economics at the University of Durham where he has since been Emeritus. 

O'Brien was elected to the Fellowship of the British Academy in 1988.

Major publications
 Information Agreements, Competition and Efficiency (with D. Swann), 1969.
 J.R. McCulloch, A Study in Classical Economics, 1970. 
 Competition in British Industry (with D. Swann, P. Maunder, W.S. Howe), 1974.
 The Classical Economists, 1975 (revised ed., 2004).
 Competition Policy, Profitability and Growth (with W.S. Howe, D.M. Wright, R.J. O'Brien), 1979.
 Authorship Puzzles in the History of Economics: A Statistical Approach (with A.C. Darnell), 1982.
 Lionel Robbins, 1988.
 Thomas Joplin and Classical Economics, 1993.
 The Development of Monetary Economics: A Modern Perspective on Monetary Controversies, 2007. 
 
Edited volumes:
 The Correspondence of Lord Overstone (3 vols.), 1971.
 Pioneers of Modern Economics in Britain (ed. and contrib., with J. Presley), 1981.
 Economic Analysis in Historical Perspective (with J. Creedy), 1984.
 Foundations of Monetary Economics (6 vols.), 1994.
 Collected Works of J.R. McCulloch (8 vols.)
 The Foundations of Business Cycle Theory (3 vols.), 1997.
 A History of Taxation, (8 vols.), 1999.

References

Secondary sources
 Creedy, John (2001) - "D.P. O'Brien's contribution to the history of economic analysis", in Historians of Economics and Economic Thought. The Construction of Disciplinary Memory, ed. Steven G. Medema and Warren J. Samuels.
 M. Blaug (ed.) - Who's who in economics (3d edition), 1999.

External reference 
Citation of Denis Patrick O'Brien as 2003 Distinguished Fellow of the History of Economics Society

1939 births
Living people
English economists
Historians of economic thought
Alumni of the University of London
Academics of Queen's University Belfast
Academics of Durham University
People from Knebworth
Fellows of the British Academy